This article shows the participating team squads at the 1986 FIVB Women's World Championship, held from 2 to 13 September in Czechoslovakia.

Coach: Zhang Rongfang

Coach: Laeita

Coach:Mambo Bok Park





Coach:Vladimir Patkin









Coach: Vladimír Hančík











References

1986 in volleyball
FIVB Volleyball Women's World Championship squads